Baghdad Central may refer to:

Baghdad Central, a 2014 novel by Elliott Colla
Baghdad Central (TV series), based on the novel
Baghdad Central Prison, formerly Abu Ghraib prison
Baghdad Central Station, the main train station in the Iraqi capital